"My Happiness" is a pop music standard which was initially made famous in the mid-twentieth century. An unpublished version of the melody with different lyrics was written by Borney Bergantine in 1933.

The most famous version of the song, with lyrics by Betty Peterson Blasco, was published for the first time in 1948.

The first known recording of this version was in December 1947 by the Marlin Sisters but the song first became a hit in May 1948 as recorded by Jon and Sondra Steele (Damon 11133) (number three) with rival versions by the Pied Pipers (Capitol 1628/15094)1 and an A cappella version by Ella Fitzgerald (Decca 24446) entering the charts that June reaching respectively numbers four and eight with the Marlin Sisters version (Columbia 38217) finally charting with a number 24 peak that July.  A version by John Laurenz (Mercury catalog number 5144, with the flip side "Someone Cares"), entered the Billboard magazine charts on August 7, 1948, where it stayed for two weeks, peaking at number 26.

Connie Francis rendition

Connie Franciswhose favorite song at the age of eight had been the Jon and Sondra Steele version of "My Happiness"remade the song in a November 6, 1958 session at the Radio Recorders studio in Hollywood, California, produced by Morton Craft and Jesse Kaye; David Rose conducted the orchestra. The song almost became Francis's first number one hit in the first months of 1959, but was kept at number two by another remake of a standard: the Platters' version of "Smoke Gets in Your Eyes".

Other versions
 Elvis Presley - "My Happiness" is one of two songs—the other being "That’s When Your Heartaches Begin"—Elvis recorded on July 18, 1953 during his first recording session at the Memphis Recording Service (Sun Studios). In January 2015, Presley's version of "My Happiness" was sold to musician Jack White at an auction for $300,000.
 Vera Lynn – If I Am Dreaming  (1956).
 Gale Storm – Gale Storm Sings (1956)
 Fats Domino – This Is Fats (1957).
 Pat Boone and Shirley Boone – for their album Side by Side (1959).
 Andy Williams – Two Time Winners (1959)
 Teresa Brewer – Songs Everybody Knows (1961).
 The Andrews Sisters – for their album Great Country Hits (1964).
 Slim Whitman – Happy Street (1968).
 Daniel O'Donnell & Mary Duff – for their album Together Again (2007).

References

1933 songs
1948 singles
1959 singles
Songs written by Borney Bergantine
Connie Francis songs
Andy Williams songs
Elvis Presley songs
Slim Whitman songs